Overhead, The Albatross are an Irish instrumental post-rock band from Dublin.

Career

Overhead, The Albatross were founded in 2009; their name derives from a line in Pink Floyd's song "Echoes": "Overhead the albatross / 
Hangs motionless upon the air / And deep beneath the rolling waves / In labyrinths of coral caves / An echo of a distant time / Comes willowing across the sand / And everything is green and submarine."

They have played at Electric Picnic, Castlepalooza, Indiependence, Hard Working Class Heroes and The Camden Crawl.

Their debut album was mostly instrumental, with vocals from the King's Hospital Choir and Straffan Lads Choir, and instrumentation from members of the RTÉ National Symphony Orchestra. Most of it was recorded in Písek, Czech Republic, in 2012–13. Released in 2016, Learning to Growl was nominated for the Choice Music Prize.

Bassist Joe Panama left the group in 2016.

Personnel
 Vinny Casey (Vance Kass; guitar)
 Stevie Darragh (guitar and bass guitar)
 Ben Garrett (drums)
 Luke Daly (director, guitar)
 David Prendergast (piano, keyboard)

Discography
EPs
Lads With Sticks (2011)
Mr Dog (2011)

Albums
 Learning to Growl (2016)

References

External links 

Overhead, The Albatross at Discogs

2009 establishments in Ireland
Irish post-rock groups
Instrumental rock musical groups
Musical groups from Dublin (city)